Mud ring feeding (or mud plume fishing) is a cooperative feeding behavior seen in bottlenose dolphins on the lower Atlantic coast of Florida, United States. Dolphins use this hunting technique to forage and trap fish. A single dolphin will swim in a circle around a group of fish, swiftly moving his tail along the sand to create a plume. This creates a temporary net around the fish and they become disoriented. The fish begin jumping above the surface, so the dolphins can lunge through the plume and catch the fish.

Strategy 
 Single dolphin in the group will begin to swim with his tail moving along the sand; initial appearance of suspended sediment will appear
 As the dolphin moves in a circle, the plume begins to grow
 Cessation of plume growth and repositioning of dolphins in orientation to the plume
 Dolphin lunges through the plume into the group of trapped fish
Mud ring feeding was first observed in 1999 in a group of 18 dolphins. An appearance of a thick cloud of suspended sediment on the surface of the water was noticed. The sediment plume then grows linearly or curvilinearly and the dolphin is observed to lead at the edge of the plume rather than just ahead. The entire behavior is observed to last an average of 17.0 seconds from the initiation of the mud plume through the final lunge. In all cases of the behavior, it is performed by a single animal and the plume is used once; though it has been seen that simultaneous plumes can be created separately by other dolphins in the group.

See also
Bubble net
 List of feeding behaviours
 Cooperative hunting
 Predation
 Pack hunter

External links 
   BBC Life Mud-ringing

References

Mammal behavior
Cetology
Eating behaviors
Collaboration